Rijkel ten Kate (November 22, 1918 – January 16, 2008) was a Dutch classical Greek scholar, translator and a professor at the Willem Lodewijk Gymnasium in Groningen. Together with C. A. Tukker, he translated the apocryphal writings of the New Testament.

Life 

Rijkel ten Kate was born on IJlst.

Education 

Because of the war, Rijkel ten Kate interrupted his studies in Sneek and Leiden. In 1955 Kate earned his PhD with his doctoral thesis Quomodo heroes in statii thebaide describantur quaeritur at the University of Groningen.

Teaching 

After the war, he finished his studies in Groningen, became a teacher of ancient languages in Stadskanaal that same summer. Four years later, he moved to the Willem Lodewijk Gymnasium in Groningen. Rijkel ten Kate had a PhD but worked in secondary education. In the late 1950s, he went to the University of Groningen and taught Latin for six years to students because he wanted to get a modern language teaching certificate, but he did not get it and returned to the Willem Lodewijk Gymnasium. There he would remain for the rest of his working life, the last two years as rector.

Views 

Together with C. A. Tukker, he translated the apocryphal writings of the New Testament. He stated: "translate what it says, not what you want it to say". He was not very fond of liberal theologians, whom he considered too far removed from reality.

He questioned the correct translation of three different Greek words (breʹphos, pai·diʹon, and pais) for "child" that appear in Luke 2. In 1993, he wrote critically in Bijbel en Wetenschap, "there was no translation of the Dutch Bible that did justice to the difference between those words", and he said that Luke 2 must be translate bréphos as "newborn child," but paidíon and páis are still lumped together as "child". It could also be questioned that, according to the Dutch Bibles, there was no space for Joseph and Mary in the inn, as Ten Kate said. Ten Kate wrote in 1997, it could also be translated as night residence, tavern, barracks, or stopping place.

Bibliography

Thesis

Books

Articles

References

Sources 

1918 births
2008 deaths
University of Groningen alumni
Translators of the Bible into Dutch